Songs of Anarchy: Music from Sons of Anarchy Seasons 1–4 is a soundtrack album featuring music from FX television program Sons of Anarchy. The album consists of songs recorded for the show as well as those previously released through a number of EPs; Sons of Anarchy: North Country (2009), Sons of Anarchy: Shelter (2009) and Sons of Anarchy: The King is Gone (2010). Songs include covers of 
"What a Wonderful World", "Forever Young", "John the Revelator and the Emmy nominated theme song "This Life" (performed by Curtis Stigers and the Forest Rangers). Musicians performing on the album include Anvil, Franky Perez (of Scars on Broadway), Lions, Alison Mosshart (of The Kills and The Dead Weather) and actress Katey Sagal, who plays Gemma Teller Morrow in the show, among others.  The album was released on November 29, 2011, through Columbia Records.

Track listing

Charts

Personnel
The album's credits and personnel can be obtained from Allmusic.

 
Anvil
 Steve Kudlow — vocals, guitars
 Glenn Gyorffy — bass
 Robb Reiner — drums

The Forest Rangers
 Bob Thiele Jr. — guitar, acoustic guitar, bass, piano, organ, keyboard, synthesizer, vocal harmonies
 Greg Leisz — guitar, banjo, lap steel guitar, mandolin
 John Philip Shenale — organ, piano, Mexican harp
 Lyle Workman — vocals, guitar
 Dave Kushner — guitar, bass
 Davey Faragher — bass
 Brian Macleod — drums, hand drums

Lions
 Matt Drenik — vocals, guitar, piano
 Austin Kalman — lead guitar, backing vocals
 Mike Sellman — bass, backing vocals
 Jake Perlman — drums

Additional musicians
 Katey Sagal — vocals, backing vocals
 Curtis Stigers — vocals
 Audra Mae — vocals
 Franky Perez — vocals
 Paul Brady — vocals
 Alison Mosshart — vocals
 Billy Valentine — vocals, backing vocals
 Gia Ciambotti — backing vocals
 Arielle Smolin — backing vocals
 Owen Thiele — backing vocals
 Jackson White — backing vocals
 Sarah White — backing vocals
 Kim Yarborough — backing vocals
 Bob Glaub — bass
 Pete Thomas — drums
 Zac Rae — organ

 
Production personnel
 Bob Thiele Jr. — producer, arranger
 Kurt Sutter — producer, arranger
 Dave Kushner — producer
 Matt Hyde — producer, engineer, mixer
 Matt Drenik — producer, engineer, mixer
 Lions — producer
 Jason Buntz — engineer
 Brian Scheuble — engineer, mixer
 Dave Way — engineer, mixer
 Ed Cherney — mixer
 Dave Warren — cover art, design

References

2011 albums
Columbia Records albums
Sons of Anarchy
Television soundtracks